The Swaner EcoCenter is a nature preserve and Utah State University Distance Education site located in Snyderville Basin near Park City, Utah. The EcoCenter works to preserve the land and the human connection to the natural landscape, to educate the local and broader communities about the value of nature, and to nurture both the ecosystem and the people connected with it. The EcoCenter was designed by architect Soren Simonsen to meet the Leadership in Energy and Environmental Design (LEED) platinum certification, the highest standard set by the U.S. Green Building Council.

History
In 2003, Swaner purchased what is now known as the Swaner Farm, adding  to the preserve.

In 1933, the iconic white barn was built by the Fletcher family who purchased the farm in 1906 and operated it for more than 35 years. The Fletcher's sold the entire farm to the Wallin family who owned the land until 2003 when it was acquired by Swaner.

In January 2010, Utah State University (USU) President Stan Albrecht and the Swaner Preserve and EcoCenter Board of Directors announced that the refuge and center would be transferred to USU. The gift totaled in excess of $30 million, making it the largest gift in USU history. Just one year later, in January 2011, classes began at the center through USU Distance Education.

See also

List of nature centers in the United States

References

External links

Buildings and structures in Summit County, Utah
Protected areas of Summit County, Utah
Nature centers in Utah
Utah State University
Sustainable building in the United States
Leadership in Energy and Environmental Design platinum certified buildings
Education in Summit County, Utah
1993 establishments in Utah